This is a list of the complete operas of the French opera composer Ambroise Thomas (1811–1896). All premieres took place in Paris unless otherwise noted.

References

Forbes, Elizabeth (1992), 'Thomas, Ambroise' in The New Grove Dictionary of Opera, ed. Stanley Sadie (London) 
Wild, Nicole; Charlton, David (2005). Théâtre de l'Opéra-Comique Paris: répertoire 1762-1972. Sprimont, Belgium: Editions Mardaga. .

 
Lists of operas by composer
Lists of compositions by composer